Oakland Park is an unincorporated community in Northampton County, Virginia, United States.

References
GNIS reference

Unincorporated communities in Virginia
Unincorporated communities in Northampton County, Virginia